The Freightliner Business Class M2 is a model range of medium-duty trucks produced by Freightliner.  In production since June 2002, the M2 is the successor to the FL-Series introduced in the 1990s.  In terms of size, the M2 is produced in Class 5 through Class 8 GVWR ratings, competing primarily against the International DuraStar and the Ford F-650/F-750 Super Duty.

Freightliner produces the Business Class M2 model range in Mount Holly, North Carolina and Santiago Tianguistenco, Mexico.

The original generation was produced from model years 2003–2022. The second generation, marketed as M2 Plus, entered production during 2022 as a 2023 model. It features a new and updated interior and a facelift grille.

Models
The Business Class M2 is produced in a wide range of configurations, in both medium-duty and severe-service configurations.   There are three different cab configurations: a 106-inch BBC (bumper to back of cab) day cab, a 132-inch BBC extended cab, and a 154-inch BBC 4-door crew cab.  The crew-cab configuration offers seating for up to six passengers.

Truck

M2 106

Named for its 106-inch BBC length in daycab configuration, the M2 106 is a Class 5-8 truck available in GVWRs up to 66,000 lbs.  The M2 106 is produced primarily as a straight truck, although its cab and chassis are used in the bus industry as a cutaway cab conversion.

M2 112

Named for its 112-inch BBC length, the M2 112 is a Class 8 truck available in GVWRs up to 80,000 lbs.  Although available as a straight truck like the M2 106, it is also available as a tractor. Externally, it is distinguished by a larger grille and slightly higher hoodline.

eM2
The e-M2, an all-electric variant of this class 5 medium duty box truck, was unveiled in mid-2018. The fast charger would allow for 80% charge in 1 hour. , it costs $400,000; about 4 times the price of the diesel equivalent.

The truck is currently being field-tested by customers. The first out of 10 trucks was delivered to Penske Truck Leasing Corporation in Los Angeles in December 2018.

Bus

Freightliner offers two variants of the M2 for bus use: the C2/S2 cowled chassis and the S2C cutaway cab bus chassis.  Serving as the donor chassis for the Thomas Saf-T-Liner C2 school bus constructed by Freightliner subsidiary Thomas Built Buses, the C2 chassis departs from previous precedent in its higher parts commonality with the M2 106 truck.  Forward of the driver's seat,  the dashboard is used in its entirety; while the windshield is redesigned (enlarged), the stock windshield wipers are retained.

Outside of school bus use, Freightliner designates the cowled bus chassis as the Freightliner S2; the model is no longer offered on the Freightliner chassis website.

The Freightliner S2C is the cutaway-cab variant of the M2.  Never produced with a school bus body, the S2C was intended for various commercial uses, including shuttle and transit bus use. A variant of the S2C cab chassis known as the S2RV is also used as a platform for midsize to large Recreational vehicles.

Severe-service trucks 

As with the FL-Series, Freightliner developed severe-service variants of the Business Class M2.  While the M2 106V and M2 112V would share the same cabs and hood as the medium-duty vehicles, they were based on their own unique chassis.  In 2011, Freightliner replaced the M2 106V/112V with the "SD" line of severe-service trucks, dropping them out of the Business Class M2 model range. While the 108SD and 114SD still used the M2 cab, an all-new hood and chassis was used.

Aftermarket
Freightliner Specialty Vehicles (also known as SportChassis LLC) is a manufacturer based in Clinton, Oklahoma that produces conversions of the Business Class M2 as consumer vehicles.  Several vehicles are available, including 5th-wheel tow vehicles and pickup trucks.  While similar in layout to the International CXT/RXT, these differ in that they are completed by a second-stage manufacturer.

See also
 Freightliner Cascadia, another Freightliner truck with an all-electric variant.

References

External links 
 M2 106 Homepage 
 M2 112 Homepage 
 SportChassis Homepage 
 

Business Class M2